Exegesis is extensive and critical interpretation of authoritative text, especially a religious text.

Exegesis may also refer to:

 The Exegesis of Philip K. Dick, a mystical autobiography by Philip K. Dick
 Exegesis, a science fiction novel by Astro Teller
 Exegesis (group), a radical neuro-linguistic programme